Kip is a surname. Notable people with the surname include:

Arthur F. Kip (1910–1995), American physicist
Hendrick Hendricksen Kip (1600–1685), Dutch magistrate in New Amsterdam
Ismaël Kip (born 1987), Dutch professional racing cyclist
Jan Kip  (1652/3–1722), Dutch artist active in England 
Leonard Kip (1826–1906), American writer
Ricardo Kip (born 1992), Dutch footballer
William Ingraham Kip (1811–1893), American Episcopal bishop
George Goelet Kip (1845-1926), a prominent American lawyer